William Alexander Massey (October 7, 1856March 5, 1914) was an American politician who served as a member of the United States Senate from Nevada.

Early life 
Born in Trumbull County, Ohio, he moved with his parents to Edgar County, Illinois in 1865. He attended public schools before studying at Union Christian College in Merom, Indiana and the Indiana Asbury University (now De Pauw University) in Greencastle, Indiana. He studied law and was admitted to the bar in 1877.

Career 
After being admitted to the bar, Massey began practicing law in Sullivan, Indiana. He moved to San Diego, California in 1886 and to Nevada in 1887, where he prospected, mined, and practiced law in Elko.

Massey was a member of the Nevada Assembly from 1892 to 1894, and was district attorney of Elko County from 1894 to 1896. He was a justice of the Nevada Supreme Court from 1896 to 1902, when he resigned. He moved to Reno, Nevada and resumed the practice of law, and was appointed as a Republican to the United States Senate by Governor Tasker Oddie, to fill the vacancy caused by the death of George S. Nixon.

Massey served in the Senate from July 1, 1912 to January 29, 1913. He was defeated for election to the remainder of Nixon's term by Democrat Key Pittman. While in the Senate, he was chairman of the Committee on Mines and Mining.

After his time in the Senate, he resumed the practice of law in Reno, Nevada.

Death 
Massey died on a train near Litchfield, California in March 1914.

References

External links

1856 births
1914 deaths
DePauw University alumni
People from Trumbull County, Ohio
Republican Party members of the Nevada Assembly
Justices of the Nevada Supreme Court
Republican Party United States senators from Nevada
People from Elko, Nevada
People from Sullivan, Indiana
19th-century American judges
Chief Justices of the Nevada Supreme Court